Zodarion machadoi is an ant spider species found in Spain, mainland Portugal and the Azores islands.

See also 
 List of Zodariidae species

References

External links 

machadoi
Spiders described in 1939
Arthropods of the Azores
Spiders of Europe